"Awake" is a song by American rapper Snoop Dogg, taken from his thirteenth album, Bush (2015). The song, produced by Pharrell Williams and Chad Hugo. The song contains additional vocals performed by Pharrell.

Background
On August 28, 2014 was released a video of what would be a preview of one of the songs work together between Snoop and Pharrell. In the video are together Snoop, Kurupt and Daz Dillinger in the background plays a verse of the song.

References

2015 songs
Snoop Dogg songs
Songs written by Snoop Dogg
Songs written by Pharrell Williams
Song recordings produced by the Neptunes